WHFS (1010 kHz) is an AM radio station in the Tampa, Florida, area, owned by Beasley Broadcast Group featuring The Dave Ramsey show, the Miller & Moulton Show, The Schnitt Show, and a daily show hosted by program director Kurt Schreiner, among other local and national programming. The station broadcasts at 50,000 watts during the day and 5,000 watts at night, directional towards the east and west to protect Jacksonville's WJXL by day, and New York City's WINS, Toronto's CFRB, and Calgary, Alberta's CBR at night. The station was assigned the WHFS call sign by the Federal Communications Commission on August 9, 2012.  Its studios are in St. Petersburg while its transmitter is located east of Mango. WHFS broadcasts a business-oriented talk radio format.

Station history

The station signed on in Autumn 1960 as WINQ, founded by Rex Rand, the owner of Miami's WINZ. In its early days, WINQ was a Mutual affiliate and carried a middle-of-the-road music format. In 1967, WINQ became the first station in Tampa Bay to offer a news-talk format, with network news and other programming from CBS Radio (who would later own this station). The station switched to a country music format in 1971, after the station was losing money on the talk programming.

By 1974, WINQ had changed to a Christian program station, featuring pre-recorded religious programing, with Southern Gospel music filling the breaks. In 1975, after an influx of call-in requests to Kevin MacKenzie's "LoveTree" Jesus Music Show, he and station manager Phil Scott agreed to continue in the direction of Christian Rock and with the assistance of program director Bill Brown WINQ became a full-time Top 40-style Christian station with live announcers, and launched what became the first commercially licensed Christian Rock radio station in the country. WINQ set the stage for all Contemporary Christian music stations that followed.

In late 1978, following Rand's death in a helicopter crash, the station was sold to different owners, who switched the format back to traditional religious programming, as WCBF ("We're Christians By Faith"), dropping the CCM format and again featuring programs produced by area churches.

In 1987, the owners of WQYK-FM acquired WCBF, and relaunched it a year later as WQYK with a country format, largely as a simulcast of its FM sister. While it was largely a simulcast of the FM station, this was a return of WQYK to the AM dial, being on 1110 (now WTIS) prior to 1974.

The station has undergone many format changes since then, alternating between country, talk and sports. In July 2004, the station switched to a hot talk format, as WBZZ, 1010 The Buzz, after acquiring the rights to Howard Stern's morning program. However, soon after Howard left for satellite radio in January 2006, the station switched from a hot talk format to a classic country format, and then changed back to all-sports as WQYK on August 10, 2007. Nanci "The Fabulous Sports Babe" Donnellan is one of WQYK's most notable alumni. The station served as Donnellan's flagship during her show's run on the now-defunct Sports Fan Radio Network, from 1997 to 2001.

WQYK's sports format moved to WHFS-FM (98.7 FM, formerly WSJT) on August 2, 2012, under the branding SportsRadio 98.7 The Fan; the WHFS callsign had previously been used on co-owned stations in Washington, D. C. and Baltimore and was "parked" or "warehoused" on a co-owned station in West Palm Beach. Concurrent with the move, WQYK changed its callsign to WHFS to match the FM station; the two stations simulcast until January 2, 2013, when the AM station became a full-time affiliate of CBS Sports Radio. Among the new hosts is Donnellan, who will host overnights.

On October 2, 2014, CBS Radio announced that it would trade all of their radio stations located in Charlotte and Tampa (including WHFS-AM), as well as WIP in Philadelphia, to the Beasley Broadcast Group in exchange for 5 stations located in Miami and Philadelphia. The swap was completed on December 1, 2014. On December 31, 2014, at 10 AM, WHFS dropped CBS Sports Radio and changed to a simulcast of WSBR's Moneytalk Radio programming. in the deal, they also lost the rights to the WHFS call sign to Beasley, though Beasley currently has no owned stations in the Baltimore–Washington market it could return the heritage calls or format to.

Translators

References

External links

HFS
Talk radio stations in the United States
HFS
1960 establishments in Florida
Radio stations established in 1960